Lithuanian Plants Genes Bank is plant gene resource guardian and sustainable use organization governed by Lithuania's Ministry of Environment. Its headquarters based in Akademija, Kėdainiai, Central Lithuania.

In 1997 the plant storage started to operate. In 2004 the Lithuanian Plants Gene Bank was established and the seed storage become a part of it. By 2017 it had 3318 samples from 201 variety of different kind of plants.

References

External links 
 Official website

Gene banks
Community seed banks
Agricultural organizations based in Lithuania
Ministry of Environment (Lithuania)
2004 establishments in Lithuania
Conservation projects
Environmental ethics
Plant reproduction